The Avtatkuul is a stream in Far East Russia. It flows through the Nizhneanadyrskaya lowlands, a region of wetlands, small lakes and tundra into the Bering Sea at the Anadyr Bay.

The Avtatkuul and its tributaries belong to the Chukotka Autonomous Okrug administrative region of Russia. The Avtatkuul wetlands surrounding the river are a Wildlife Refuge.

References

   
  

Rivers of Chukotka Autonomous Okrug
Drainage basins of the Bering Sea